Josef Skupa (16 January 1892 in Strakonice – 8 January 1957 in Prague) was a Czech puppeteer.

He studied at the Academy of Arts, Architecture and Design in Prague, and worked as stage designer in the Plzeň City Theatre, also as designer in Skoda Engineering Works.

In year 1919 and 1926, respectively, he created his most famous puppets: comical father Spejbl and his rascal son Hurvínek. In 1930 he set up the first modern professional puppet theatre. In 1933 he became the president of the International Puppetry Association UNIMA.

During the Nazi occupation of Czechoslovakia, Skupa performed satiric and allegorical puppet plays on hundreds of stages all over Czechoslovakia. After 1945, he moved his theatre to Prague. He was praised as an official "national artist" during the Communist regime but he was criticised for his lack of political engagement. Therefore, Skupa focused on plays for children, and mime with puppets for adults. He also performed abroad (Great Britain, Poland, France, Hungary, USSR).

References

External links
 Official webpage of Theatre of Spejbl and Hurvinek

1892 births
1957 deaths
People from Strakonice
Czech puppeteers
UNIMA presidents
Academy of Arts, Architecture and Design in Prague alumni